Carlos Heredia Fontana (born on 28 September 1998) is a  professional footballer who plays as a winger. Born in Spain, he plays for the Dominican Republic national team.

Career
Heredia joined Wolverhampton Wanderers in 2017 from English club Milton Keynes Dons. He was released at the end of the 2018–19 season.

Following his release from the Premier League side, Heredia signed a contract with Miedź Legnica lasting until 2023. He made his professional debut for the club in a 1–0 defeat to Stal Mielec, replacing Krzysztof Danielewicz.

International career
On 9 September 2018, Heredia made his debut for Dominican Republic  in the qualifying rounds of the CONCACAF Nations League against Bonaire in a 5–0 victory, scoring the fifth goal.

International goals
Scores and results list Dominican Republic's goal tally first.

References

External links
Carlos Heredia en Fútbol Dominicano. Net

https://www.futboltotalrd.com/player/carlos-heredia/

1998 births
Living people
Footballers from Barcelona
Dominican Republic footballers
Dominican Republic international footballers
Spanish footballers
Spanish people of Dominican Republic descent
Citizens of the Dominican Republic through descent
Association football forwards
Sportspeople of Dominican Republic descent
Expatriate footballers in Poland
Miedź Legnica players